Valley Regional High School (VRHS) is located in Deep River, Connecticut, United States. It serves the three towns of Regional School District No. 4 - Essex, Chester, and Deep River.

In its 2011 edition, Newsweek magazine named Valley Regional as one of "America's Best High Schools," ranking 334th out of 500 nationally.

Controversies

Mascot controversy
In the fall of 2019, controversy grew over the Valley Regional High School mascot, the "Warriors". Outcry reached a height after many students, former and current, spoke out, arguing that the mascot was disrespectful towards the Native American community. Eventually, in the fall of 2019, the administration decided to change the mascot. It is unknown if the mascot was changed to end the controversy or to show respect for Native American tribes, but as of 2019 Valley regional high school's mascot has been changed to the Valley "V"s.

Eric Rice controversy

In July 2010, the Region 4 Board of Education announced its selection of Eric Rice as the new principal of Valley Regional High School. Superintendent Levy was a vocal advocate for Rice's selection, stating he has "an outstanding background in science, mathematics, and technology,” and a strong “commitment to our school community."

However, after less than three weeks on the job, reports surfaced of his possible dismissal with unconfirmed accounts that Superintendent Levy had given an ultimatum that Rice resign or face possible dismissal. Approximately two weeks later, the Region 4 Board of Education accepted the resignation of Eric Rice, making him the shortest serving principal in school history. Board of Education Chairwoman Linda Hall declined to comment on whether Rice's resignation was voluntary.

An Essex resident filed a complaint with the Connecticut Department of Education against the superintendent, alleging an "abuse of power" by Levy. The filed complaint also stated that the civil rights of the high school students had been violated due to a supposed "gag order" that "prevented students from discussing the circumstances of Rice’s departure." The Connecticut Department of Education responded in a letter dated November 8, 2010 dismissing the complaint due to a lack of accompanying evidence to support the allegations. Superintendent Levy vehemently denied any "gag order" had been placed upon the students at the high school; the Board of Education subsequently hired an independent party (later determined to be Madison lawyer Stacey Lafferty) to investigate reports of a gag order, which found "no evidence or support for the claim that a gag order was issued or sanctioned,” or that the civil rights of students were violated." The exact reason for the abrupt departure of Eric Rice have remained confidential and were not revealed to residents of Region 4.

Academics 
Valley Regional offers students a variety of classes spanning numerous subjects, including Art, Business, Mathematics, Music, English, World Languages, Science, and Technology Education. The school functions according to the block schedule, with each student enrolling in four courses per semester or a combination of full semester classes and quarter classes (which must add up to four full credits).

In order to graduate, students must earn 28.5 credits - a mixture of required as well as elective coursework.

Valley Regional offers Advanced Placement courses.

The school also maintains a relationship with the state's flagship collegiate institution, The University of Connecticut. Students must earn a grade of "C" or better if they wish to use the college credit at UConn or other universities that accept UConn credit.

Newsweek ranking 
In its 2011 edition ranking "America's Best High Schools," Newsweek magazine named the Valley Regional 334th out of 500 nationally.

Athletics 
Valley Regional is a part of the Shoreline Conference of the Connecticut Interscholastic Athletic Conference (CIAC), with the exception of football, which is a member of the Pequot League, Sassacus division. The school's varsity sports consist of soccer, cross country, American football, volleyball, field hockey, indoor track, basketball, gymnastics, swimming, track, lacrosse, baseball, softball, golf, and tennis. The high school shares an athletic relationship with students from Lyme-Old Lyme High School for the football team.

The soccer team achieved a 16-4-1 record and advanced to its first state final championship match since 2000. The football team had first undefeated record (10-0) ever and advanced to the state final championship match. The girls' cross-country team ended the season undefeated, with a record of 19–0, and placed third in the state overall.

On March 18, 2011, the boys' basketball team won the Class S State Championship. The win brought the high school its very first state basketball title.

Notable alumni

 Brian Dayett, Former MLB player (New York Yankees, Chicago Cubs)
 Lee Tergesen, Actor, (Oz, Wayne's World)
 Gretchen Mol, Actress, Model (Rounders)

References 

Chester, Connecticut
Deep River, Connecticut
Essex, Connecticut
Schools in Middlesex County, Connecticut
Public high schools in Connecticut